Sauda Skisenter is a winter sports centre located on a mountain above the village of Saudasjøen and about 5 kilometers from the town of Sauda in Rogaland, Norway.

References

External links
Sauda Skisenter website

Ski areas and resorts in Norway